This list encompasses castles described in German as Burg (castle), Festung (fort/fortress), Schloss (manor house, palace, country house or stately home) and Palais/Palast (palace). Many German castles after the middle ages were mainly built as royal or ducal palaces rather than as a fortified building.

Castles
 Schloss Allner, Hennef
 Altena Castle, Altena
 Arloff Castle, Arloff
 Baesweiler Castle, Baesweiler
 Schloss Berleburg, Bad Berleburg
 Godesburg Festung, Bad Godesberg
 Alte Burg, Bad Münstereifel
 Moyland Castle, Bedburg-Hau
 Bevergern Castle, Bevergern
 Sparrenburg Castle, Bielefeld
 Bilstein Castle, Lennestadt
 Blankenheim Castle, Blankenheim
 Palais Schaumburg, Bonn
 Gemen Castle, Borken, North Rhine-Westphalia
 Schloss Beck, Bottrop
 Brüggen Castle, Brüggen
 Augustusburg and Falkenlust Palaces, Brühl
 Schloss Bladenhorst, Castrop-Rauxel
 Schloss Detmold, Detmold
 Haus Dellwig, Dortmund
 Hohensyburg, Dortmund
 Husen Castle, Dortmund
 Wasserschloss Haus Bodelschwingh, Dortmund
 Schloss Benrath, Düsseldorf
 Düsseldorfer Schloss
 Mickeln House, Düsseldorf
 Ehreshoven Castle, Engelskirchen
 Kambach Castle, Eschweiler
 Roethgen Castle, Eschweiler
 Palant Castle, Eschweiler
 Kinzweiler Castle, Eschweiler
 Eschweiler Castle, Eschweiler
 Nothberg Castle, Eschweiler
 Weisweiler Castle, Eschweiler
 Schloss Baldeney, Essen 
 Schloss Borbeck, Essen
 Schloss Hugenpoet, Essen
 Schloss Schellenberg, Essen
 Haus Bamenohl, Finnentrop
 Schloss Berge, Gelsenkirchen
 Schloss Horst, Gelsenkirchen
 Mark Castle, Hamm
 Heessen Castle, Hamm
 Blankenstein Castle, Hattingen
 Reifferscheid Castle, Hellenthal
 Klusenstein Castle, Hemer
 Schloss Strünkede, Herne
 Schloss Herten, Herten
 Schloss Westerholt, Herten
 Fürstenberg Castle, Höingen (nr Ense)
 House Opherdicke, Holzwickede
 Hückeswagen Castle, Hückeswagen
Schloss Drachenburg, Königswinter
 Linn Castle, Krefeld
 Schloss Iggenhausen, Lage
 Holzheim Castle, Langerwehe
 Schloss Brake, Lemgo
 Morsbroich Castle, Leverkusen
 Schloss Neuenhof, Lüdenscheid
 Vischering Castle, Lüdinghausen

 Gimborn Castle, Marienheide
 Schloss Rheydt, Mönchengladbach
 Schloss Wickrath, Mönchengladbach 
 Monschau Castle, Monschau
 Schloss Broich, Mülheim
 Schloss Styrum, Mülheim
 Castle of Münster, Münster 
 Schloss Nörvenich, formerly Gymnicher Burg, Nörvenich
 Krickenbeck Castle, Nettetal
 Schloss Reuschenberg, Neuss
 Homburg Castle, Nümbrecht
 Schloss Nordkirchen, Nordkirchen
 Vondern Castle, Oberhausen
 Kastell Holten, Oberhausen 
 Schloss Oberhausen, Oberhausen
 Wewelsburg, near Paderborn
 Schloss Darfeld, Rosendahl
 Ordensburg Vogelsang, Schleiden
 Schloss Cappenberg, Selm
 Schloss Burg near Solingen 
 Stolberg Castle, Stolberg (Rhineland)
 Burg Tecklenburg, Tecklenburg 
 Schloss Hardenberg, Velbert
 Münchhausen Castle, Wachtberg
 Wasserburg Adendorf, Wachtberg
 Gudenau Castle, Wachtberg
 Odenhausen Castle, Wachtberg
 Hardenstein Castle, Witten
 Gödersheim Castle, Wollersheim
 Zülpich Castle, Zülpich

See also
List of castles
List of castles in Germany